Ruslan Panteleymonov (2 August 1983 – 23 August 2022) was a Ukrainian-born artistic gymnast representing Great Britain and England internationally, and an international diving coach after retirement. He was part of the Great Britain team to win gold at the 2012 European Championships, and was reserve for the bronze medal-winning Great Britain team at the 2012 Summer Olympics.

Personal life 
Born in Kharkiv, Ukraine, Panteleymonov spent a childhood in Ukrainian gymnastics. With his coach Alex Shyryayev he was part of the Ukrainian squad. He moved to England in 2001 to join his coach who was by then coaching at Hinckley Gymnastics Club in England. Ruslan also worked part time as a coach and gained UK citizenship some years later which allowed him to transfer allegiance and compete for Great Britain.

He excelled in the Great Britain team that won the nation's first ever team gold at the 2012 European Championships in Montpellier. Panteleymonov’s 16.1 vault score, in particular, moved Britain into first place ahead of Russia, in what turned out to be a crucial turning point in the competition. Ruslan was travelling reserve for the London Olympic Games.

After retirement, Panteleymonov joined British Swimming as a gymnastics coach for the diving team. He worked with British divers in the build-up to their record-breaking performances at the 2016 Olympic Games in Rio de Janeiro and the 2020 Olympic Games in Tokyo, as well as World Championship and European Championship campaigns.

Death 
Panteleymonov died on 23 August 2022. He was 39 years old, survived by a wife and a son.

References

1983 births
2022 deaths
Sportspeople from Kharkiv
Sportspeople from Gravesend, Kent
British male artistic gymnasts
Ukrainian male artistic gymnasts
Gymnasts at the 2012 Summer Olympics
Ukrainian emigrants to the United Kingdom
European champions in gymnastics
21st-century British people
21st-century Ukrainian people